Josiah Scott may refer to:

Josiah Scott (politician) (1803–1879), American politician
Josiah Scott (American football) (born 1999), American football cornerback

See also
Josiah Scott House, on the National Register of Historic Places in Idaho